Marek Andrzej Panas (born 7 November 1951 in Elbląg) is a former Polish handball player who competed in the 1980 Summer Olympics.

In 1980 he was part of the Polish team which finished seventh in the Summer Olympics. He played five matches and scored twelve goals.

External links
profile 

1951 births
Living people
Polish male handball players
Handball players at the 1980 Summer Olympics
Olympic handball players of Poland
People from Elbląg
Sportspeople from Warmian-Masurian Voivodeship